Chopper may refer to:

Arts and entertainment
 Chopper (comics), a horror comic book mini-series 
 Chopper (film), a 2000 Australian film by and about Mark "Chopper" Read
 Chopper (Judge Dredd), a character in British comics anthologies 2000 AD and Judge Dredd 
 Chopper (video game), a 2009 iOS video game
 Chopper I, a 1988 video game developed by SNK Playmore
 Tony Tony Chopper, a character from the manga and anime One Piece

People
 Christopher Hope (journalist) (born 1971), British journalist
 Mark "Chopper" Read (1954–2013), Australian criminal, author and recording artist

Transportation
 Chopper (motorcycle), a type of customized motorcycle
 Chopper bicycle, a customized bicycle modeled after the motorcycle
 Raleigh Chopper, a model of bicycles
 A colloquialism for helicopter
 A nickname for the British Rail Class 20 diesel-electric locomotive
 Chopper coupler

Other
 Chopper (archaeology), a stone tool
 Chopper (electronics), a switching device
 Chopper (ghost), an alleged ghost in Germany
 Chopper (propeller), a propeller design
 Chopper (rap), a vocal delivery style
 Chopper (Star Wars character), a droid from the Star Wars Rebels animated series
 Nick Chopper, the Tin Woodman in L. Frank Baum's Oz series

See also